Beatrice Rigoni (born 1 August 1995) is an Italian rugby union player who plays centre and winger for Valsugana Rugby Padova and the Italy women's national rugby union team.

Sporting career
Beatrice Rigoni was born on 1 August 1995. She began playing rugby at the age of six, alongside her brothers, for the youth team of Petrarca Rugby in Padua, Italy. She continued to play for them until she turned 12, at which point she was no longer able to take part as mixed teams were not run above that age. She then moved to Valsugana Rugby Padova where she was a member of two under-16s championship teams and was named to the adult first team. While she was still attending the Tito Livio School in Padua, she was named to the Italy women's national rugby union team for the 2014 Women's Six Nations Championship at the age of 18. She made her international debut in the 12-11 defeat over Wales, the first match of the tournament for both teams.

She continued to play for club and country while attending the University of Ferrara where she is studying to be a pharmacist. Rigoni played for Italy at the 2017 Women's Rugby World Cup.

Rigoni was selected in Italy's squad for the 2021 Rugby World Cup in New Zealand.

References

Living people
1995 births
Sportspeople from Padua
University of Ferrara alumni
Italian female rugby union players